Schloonsee is a lake in Mecklenburg-Vorpommern, Germany. It belongs to Bansin on Usedom island. At an elevation of 0 m, its surface area is 0.14 km².

References 
 

Lakes of Mecklenburg-Western Pomerania